Fadil Hadžić (23 April 1922 – 3 January 2011) was a Croatian and Yugoslav film director, screenwriter, playwright and journalist, mainly known for his comedy films and plays. He was born in Bileća in Bosnia and Herzegovina, but mainly lived and worked in Zagreb, with the Croatian and wider Yugoslav productions.

Biography 
Born in Bileća in Herzegovina, in what was then Yugoslavia, he went to study painting at the Academy of Fine Arts, University of Zagreb. He then worked on editing several popular magazines (Kerempuh, Vjesnik u srijedu, Telegram). He was also one of the founders of the prominent theatres Kerempuh (then called Jazavac) and Komedija in Zagreb, and also worked as the intendant at the Zagreb's Croatian National Theatre.

He had his screenwriting debut in 1952 with the animated film The Haunted Castle at Dudinci, directed by Dušan Vukotić. In 1961, Hadžić had his directorial debut with Alphabet of Fear (Abeceda straha). He was a prolific and versatile filmmaker throughout the 1960s and his film Official Position (Službeni položaj) won the Big Golden Arena for Best Film at the 1964 Pula Film Festival. In the 1970s and 1980s his output was lower, but in spite of this he won the Golden Arena for Best Director for his 1979 film Journalist (Novinar).

Hadžić also wrote and directed the 1972 film, The Deer Hunt (Lov na jelene), starring Boris Dvornik and Silvana Armenulić, a subversive thriller-drama about an émigré suspected of Ustasha activity, which was timely and popular because of its relation to the Croatian Spring.

In the early 1980s, he effectively stopped making films, and turned to playwriting. In this period he wrote more than 57 popular plays and had 14 solo exhibitions of his paintings. In the early 2000s, he became active in film again, directing a couple of film adaptations of his comedy plays in 2003 and 2005, followed by the war drama Remember Vukovar (Zapamtite Vukovar) in 2008. He died in Zagreb.

References 

Notes

Other sources

Further reading

External links 

Fadil Hadžić biography at Film.hr 
http://www.jutarnji.hr/kerempuh--preminuo-hrvatski-komediograf-fadil-hadzic/915265/  

1922 births
2011 deaths
People from Bileća
Bosniaks of Bosnia and Herzegovina
Bosniaks of Croatia
Golden Arena for Best Director winners
Vladimir Nazor Award winners
Academy of Fine Arts, University of Zagreb alumni
Yugoslav film directors
Yugoslav screenwriters
Bosnia and Herzegovina screenwriters
Male screenwriters
Bosnia and Herzegovina dramatists and playwrights
Bosnia and Herzegovina film directors
Bosnia and Herzegovina filmmakers
Croatian film directors
Croatian screenwriters
Croatian satirists
Croatian dramatists and playwrights
20th-century dramatists and playwrights
Bosnia and Herzegovina male writers
Burials at Mirogoj Cemetery